Zir Daj (also Romanized as Zīr Daj; also known as Cher Daj, Daj, Jerdaj, and Jīrdaj) is a village in Pir Sohrab Rural District, in the Central District of Chabahar County, Sistan and Baluchestan Province, Iran. At the 2006 census, its population was 203, in 34 families.

References 

Populated places in Chabahar County